Louis Joseph Alexandre Matte (March 6, 1893 – June 13, 1961) was a Canadian professional ice hockey player who played four seasons in the National Hockey League for the Toronto St. Pats, Hamilton Tigers, Boston Bruins and Montreal Canadiens. He also spent two years in the Western Canada Hockey League with the Saskatoon Sheiks and Vancouver Maroons, and one season in the Pacific Coast Hockey Association with the Maroons, retiring in 1926.

Career statistics

Regular season and playoffs

External links

1893 births
1961 deaths
Boston Bruins players
Canadian ice hockey forwards
Hamilton Tigers (ice hockey) players
Ice hockey people from Ontario
Montreal Canadiens players
People from Clarence-Rockland
Pittsburgh Yellow Jackets (IHL) players
Saskatoon Sheiks players
Toronto St. Pats players
Vancouver Maroons players
Canadian expatriate ice hockey players in the United States